Ri Byong-sam is a North Korean former footballer. He represented North Korea on at least one occasion in 2002.

Career statistics

International

References

1979 births
Living people
North Korean footballers
North Korea international footballers
Association football midfielders